Leavin' La Vida Loca is the debut studio album by American band Antarctigo Vespucci. It was released on July 24, 2015 through Quote Unquote Records. The album's title is a parody of the song Livin' La Vida Loca.

Track listing

References

2015 albums
Antarctigo Vespucci albums